Kurumpoondi is a village in the Gandaravakottai revenue block of Pudukkottai district, Tamil Nadu, India.

Demographics
As per the 2001 census, Kurumpoondi had a total population of 1363 with 690 males and 673 females. Out of the total population 817 people were literate.

References

Villages in Pudukkottai district